Since the Vietnam War, most Vietnamese aircraft were supplied by the Soviet Union and later Russia, while hundreds of others were left by the United States via South Vietnam. Most of these are no longer in service either due to the unavailability of parts or the age of the aircraft.

To decrease its dependence on Russian weapons as the nation moves towards modernisation, Vietnam has begun to explore the purchase of American and European aircraft, especially due to its conflict in the South China Sea with its former Communist ally China.

Aircraft

Current

Munitions

Air defence

Former

See also
 Vietnam People's Air Force
 Aircraft losses of the Vietnam War

References

Air Force
People's Army of Vietnam
Vietnam, Air Force
Vietnam, Equipment